Artesian Future Technology LLC, doing business as Artesian Builds, was an American custom PC manufacturing company.

History 
Artesian Builds was founded as Artesian Future Technologies in 2017 by Noah Katz to sell cryptocurrency mining rigs. Katz's other business venture was an Etsy store selling custom cosplay armor founded in 2015.  Artesian Future Technologies was rebranded in 2020 as Artesian Builds to a custom high-end PC gaming manufacturer. Artesian would build PCs live on Twitch.

Controversy 
On March 1, 2022, Artesian held a Twitch live stream where it held sweepstakes to give away a PC. A streamer, Kiapiaa, won the giveaway, but Katz refused to give her the PC, claiming that she did not meet the requirements to be an "ambassador" because she didn't have a big enough social media following. Katz proceeded to reroll the sweepstakes. The decision caused an immediate uproar, with the company apologizing.

Bankruptcy and aftermath 
On March 9, 2022, Artesian announced that it suspended all of its activities. On June 18, 2022, Artesian announced that it was holding a bankruptcy auction to sell off its assets. The assets sold in the auction included PC components, PCs, and GPUs.

References

2017 establishments in California
2022 disestablishments in California
American companies established in 2017
American companies disestablished in 2022
Companies that filed for Chapter 11 bankruptcy in 2022
Computer companies established in 2017
Computer companies disestablished in 2022
Defunct computer companies of the United States